Kevin Edmund Lawton (born 28 September 1960) is a former New Zealand rower who won an Olympic bronze medal at the 1984 Summer Olympics in Los Angeles.

Lawton was born in 1960 in Auckland, New Zealand. Along with Don Symon, Barrie Mabbott, Ross Tong and Brett Hollister (cox), Lawton won the bronze medal in the coxed four. He is listed as New Zealand Olympian athlete number 461 by the New Zealand Olympic Committee.

He now lives on a lifestyle block in Leigh, with his wife and their four daughters.

References

External links
 
 

1960 births
Living people
New Zealand male rowers
Olympic rowers of New Zealand
Olympic bronze medalists for New Zealand
Rowers at the 1984 Summer Olympics
Rowers from Auckland
Olympic medalists in rowing
Medalists at the 1984 Summer Olympics
20th-century New Zealand people